Hans Peter Joakim Nilsson (born 31 March 1966) is a Swedish former professional footballer who played as a midfielder. He played for Landskrona BoIS and Malmö FF in his native Sweden, and Sporting de Gijón in Spain during a career that spanned between 1985 and 1995. He appeared for the Swedish national team a total of 27 times, and participated in the 1990 FIFA World Cup in Italy as well as UEFA Euro 1992. He also represented the Sweden Olympic team at the 1988 Summer Olympics.

Career statistics

International 

 Scores and results list Sweden's goal tally first, score column indicates score after each Nilsson goal.

References

External links
 
 
 

1966 births
Living people
Association football defenders
Swedish footballers
Sweden international footballers
Swedish expatriate sportspeople in Spain
Landskrona BoIS players
Malmö FF players
Sporting de Gijón players
Allsvenskan players
La Liga players
1990 FIFA World Cup players
UEFA Euro 1992 players
Olympic footballers of Sweden
Footballers at the 1988 Summer Olympics
Expatriate footballers in Spain
People from Landskrona Municipality
Footballers from Skåne County